is a fantasy adventure anime series created by Osamu Tezuka.   The anime is based from classic film Konjok-gorbunok  by Ivan Ivanov-Vano. The film in turn is based from Pyotr Pavlovich Yershov's The Little Humpbacked Horse.

This was Tezuka's last anime series. Osamu Tezuka died while this series was in production. The studio completed the production according to his plans. The show was streamed at Anime Sols, but was removed, because it did not meet its goal of crowd-funding for DVD. It is currently only available for legal streaming at Viki.com.

Story

The story opens with the meeting between the hero, Kakeru, and a mystical pony named Blink. Kakeru saves Blink from a thunder shower and in gratitude, Blink tells him that if he is ever in trouble, all Kakeru needs to do is call out his name three times and he will appear. At the end of the summer when Kakeru returns home, his father, a writer of children's stories, is kidnapped. Kakeru, weeping, calls out Blink's name and, as promised, Blink immediately appears, and the two set out on the trail of Kakeru's father.

Episode list

Original Cast

Masako Nozawa as Kakeru
Miki Itou as Princess Kirara
Ai Orikasa as Julie
Goro Naya as Shiki Haruhiko
Katsuya Kobayashi as Tanba
Kei Tomiyama as Henry
Kenichi Ogata as Nitch
Mari Mashiba as Spika
Saori Tsuchiya as Blink
Satoko Yasunaga as Nana
Sho Hayami as Prince Horo
You Yoshimura as Satch
Yuriko Fuchizaki as Rakururu

Music

See also

 The Little Humpbacked Horse (ballet)

References

External links
 Blue Blink in IMDB
 Aoi Blink Credits in BCDB
 

1989 anime television series debuts
Action anime and manga
Fantasy anime and manga
Osamu Tezuka anime
Supernatural anime and manga
Tezuka Productions